The first Delhi Legislative Assembly election to the Delhi Legislative Assembly was held on 27 March 1952. Forty-eight seats were up for election. Six of the constituencies elected two assembly members, the remaining 36 constituencies elected a single member.

Results
Congress emerged as the single largest party in the first legislative elections held in Delhi. Chaudhary Brahm Prakash of Indian National Congress was elected Chief Minister.

!colspan=10|
|- style="background-color:#E9E9E9; text-align:center;"
! colspan=2|Party !! Seats  Contested !! Won !! % of  Seats !! Votes !! Vote %
|- style="background: #90EE90;"
| 
| style="text-align:left;" |Indian National Congress
| 47 || 39 || 81.25 || 2,71,812 || 52.09
|-
| 
| style="text-align:left;" |Bharatiya Jana Sangh
| 31 || 5 || 10.42 || 1,14,207 || 21.89
|-
| 
| style="text-align:left;" |Socialist Party
| 6 || 2 || 4.17 || 12,396 || 2.38
|-
| 
| style="text-align:left;" |Akhil Bharatiya Hindu Mahasabha
| 5 || 1 || 2.08 || 6,891 || 1.32
|-
| 
| 78 || 1 || 2.08 || 82,972 || 15.90
|- class="unsortable" style="background-color:#E9E9E9"
! colspan = 2| Total Seats
! 48 !! style="text-align:center;" |Voters !! 7,44,668 !! style="text-align:center;" |Turnout !! 5,21,766 (58.52%)
|}

Elected members

State Reorganization
On 1 November 1956, under States Reorganisation Act, 1956, Delhi was made a Union Territory under the direct administration of the President of India and the Delhi Legislative Assembly was abolished simultaneously. Next legislative assembly elections in Delhi were held in 1993, when Union Territory of Delhi was formally declared as National Capital Territory of Delhi by the Sixty-ninth Amendment to the Indian constitution.

See also
 1951–52 elections in India
 1993 Delhi Legislative Assembly election

References

1952
Delhi
1950s in Delhi
March 1952 events in Asia